Assault & Battery is a compilation album released by Receiver Records in 1997. Most tracks were previously unreleased or were b-sides from singles.

Track listing
 "Happy Days"
 "Enter Darkness"
 "Leaders"
 "Hang the Pope"
 "Radiation Sickness"
 "Hypocrisy"
 "Behind Glass Walls"
 "No Time"
 "Hour Shower"
 "Saddam"
 "Preaching to the Deaf"
 "Hang the Pope"
 "Ping"
 "Torture Tactics" (live)
 "Fight to be Free" (live)
 "Trail of Tears" (live)
 "Ping Again" (live)
 "Butt Fuck" (live)

References

Nuclear Assault albums
B-side compilation albums
1997 compilation albums
Heavy metal compilation albums